Vanessa Gounden (born 1961) is South Africa's first female mining magnate and a successful female entrepreneur, whose business interest span healthcare services, financial services and lifestyle and leisure.

Career

Holgoun Investment Holdings

In 2003, along with her husband Sivi, she started HolGoun Investment Holdings, a South African investment holding company. They began HolGoun with very little and built it into an extremely successful multi-divisional company.

HolGoun Investment Holdings has its  primary investment in coal and uranium, but has activity in a wide range of sectors including mining and exploration, healthcare, financial services, property, fashion. Gounden currently works as the Chief Executive Officer for HolGoun. The HolGoun group also has investments in HolGoun Healthcare, HG Risk Management Solutions, HG Property and HG Lifestyle and Leisure.

Fashion Line: Vanessa G London

She launched her clothing line, Vanessa G London, in March 2011 at London Fashion Week held at Banqueting House in London. The women's luxury fashion label encompasses a range of casual, cocktail, formal and haute couture “ready to wear” clothing.

References

Living people
1961 births
University of Pretoria alumni
South African women in politics
South African mining businesspeople
South African people of Indian descent
20th-century South African politicians
21st-century South African businesspeople